The Javan blue-banded kingfisher (Alcedo euryzona), is a species of kingfisher in the subfamily Alcedininae. Its natural habitats are subtropical or tropical moist lowland forest, subtropical or tropical mangrove forest, and rivers. It's a small, rather dark kingfisher. Male is highly distinctive, with a broad blue-green band across a white chest. Female is very different, with an all-orange belly; distinguished from Common Kingfisher by overall duller, darker coloration and the lack of a bright white-and-orange patch behind the eye, its call is piercing similar to the common kingfisher. It is found in Java.

Taxonomy
The first formal description of the Javan blue-banded kingfisher was by the Dutch zoologist Coenraad Jacob Temminck in 1830. In his initial publication the binomial name was incorrectly printed as Alcedo cryzona but this was later corrected to Alcedo euryzona. The specific epithet euryzona is from the classical Greek eurus meaning "broad" and zōnē meaning "band" or "belt".

References

External links

BirdLife Species Factsheet.

Alcedo
Birds of Indonesia
Birds described in 1830
Taxonomy articles created by Polbot